Ranbir Pura (Kaurji Wala) is a small village in Patiala District in Punjab, India. It is near the Bhakhra Canal on the roads to Sangrur and Nabha. This village has two different names. The village land was given to farmers by Maharajah Patiala's brother. Any brother of a king was called "Kaurji" and this gives the village its name - Kaurji Wala. The village's second name is Ranbir Pura. It is about 10 km from the city of Patiala. The village has one gurdwara.

Ranbir Pura(Kaurjiwala) is a small and very famous village in Patiala district of Punjab state in India. It is situated near about 10 km from Patiala city on Sangrur Road near Bhakhra Canal. This Village has two different names, Ranbir Pura and Kaurjiwala. Ranbir Pura is Official name of this village. The village land was given to farmers by Maharajah Patiala's brother. Any brother of a king was called "Kaurji" and this gives the village its name - Kaurji Wala. this village has two Govt. Schools, one big Playground, Two Gurudwaras, one church. Majority of people living in this village belong to Sikh religion and there are some houses of Hindus and Christians as well. People from all religion are living together and peacefully, celebrating all festivals together.

Gallery

References

Patiala
Villages in Patiala district